William Galligan (5 January 1937 – 1 February 2023) was an Irish hurler. He lined out with a number of club sides, including Charleville, Lees, Blackrock and Claughaun, and also played at inter-county level with Cork.

Career
Galligan first played hurling at juvenile and underage levels with the Seán Clárachs side that won consecutive North Cork MHC titles in 1952 and 1953. He progressed to adult level with Charleville, with his performamnces also earning selection for the Avondhu divisional team. Galligan transferred to the Blackrock club in 1960 and won a Cork SHC title after a defeat of Avondhu in the 1961 final. He transferred to the Claughaun club in Limerick in 1969 and won two consecutive Limerick SFC titles as well as a Limerick SHC title in 1971.

Galligan first appeared on the inter-county scene as right wing-forward on the Cork junior hurling team that beat Warwickshire in the 1958 All-Ireland final. He won a Munster JHC medal in 1960. Galligan also made a number of appearances for the senior team in various tournament games, however, he never made it onto the championship team. Galligan won an All-Ireland IHC medal in 1965.

Personal life and death
Galligan's father, also called Bill, was also a hurler who played with a number of club teams, including Bruree, Croom, Ballyhea and Charleville. He also played with the London Irish team in the All-Ireland JHC. His son, Mike Galligan, played with Claughan and won National League and Munster SHC medals with Limerick.

Galligan died on 1 February 2023, at the age of 86.

Honours
Seán Clárachs
North Cork Minor Hurling Championship: 1952, 1953

Blackrock
Cork Senior Hurling Championship: 1961

Claughaun
Limerick Senior Hurling Championship: 1971
Limerick Senior Football Championship: 1970, 1971

Cork
All-Ireland Intermediate Hurling Championship: 1965
Munster Intermediate Hurling Championship: 1965
All-Ireland Junior Hurling Championship: 1958
Munster Junior Hurling Championship: 1958, 1960

References

1937 births
2023 deaths
Charleville hurlers
Blackrock National Hurling Club hurlers
Lees Gaelic footballers
Claughaun hurlers
Claughaun Gaelic footballers
Avondhu hurlers
Cork inter-county hurlers